Gen. I.H. Duval Mansion, also known as the General I.H. Duval House No. 4 and Charles D. and Marjorie Bell Residence, is a historic country home located at Wellsburg, Brooke County, West Virginia. It was built in 1858, and is a two-story, five bay, rectangular brick dwelling with a hipped roof in the Greek Revival style.  It features a three bay portico with a hipped roof and supported by squared Tuscan order columns.  It was built by American Civil War General and Congressman Isaac H. Duval (1824-1902).

It was listed on the National Register of Historic Places in 1986.

References

Houses on the National Register of Historic Places in West Virginia
Greek Revival houses in West Virginia
Houses completed in 1858
Houses in Brooke County, West Virginia
National Register of Historic Places in Brooke County, West Virginia